

Baroness of Elbeuf

House of Harcourt, 1265–1419

English occupation, 1419–1444

House of Harcourt, 1444–1476
None

House of Lorraine, 1476–1528

Marquise of Elbeuf

House of Lorraine, 1528–1583

Duchess of Elbeuf

House of Lorraine, 1583–1845

See also
Duchess of Guise
Duchess of Lorraine
Duchess of Aumale

House of Lorraine
Duchesses of Elbeuf
House of Guise
Elbeulf
French duchesses
Lists of French nobility
Lists of French women